

Events

Births
 Shiwu (died 1352), Chinese Chan poet and hermit.

Deaths
 Enzio of Sardinia (born 1218), knight and general who wrote poems after being captured and imprisoned.

13th-century poetry
Poetry